Blas Jacobo Beltrán (born 22 July 1746 in Luesma) was a Spanish clergyman and bishop for the Roman Catholic Diocese of Ibiza, and later Roman Catholic Diocese of Coria. He was appointed bishop in 1805. He died in 1821.

References

19th-century Roman Catholic bishops in Spain
1746 births
1821 deaths
People from the Province of Zaragoza